Corduroy is a 1968 children's book written and illustrated by Don Freeman, and published by the Viking Press. Based on a 2007 online poll, the National Education Association listed the book as one of its "Teachers' Top 100 Books for Children." It was one of the "Top 100 Picture Books" of all time in a 2012 poll by School Library Journal. The book is about the titular character, an anthropomorphic teddy bear, in a department store.

History
Don Freeman explained that he had an idea of writing a story taking place in a department store, in which a character wanders around after the doors close. He wanted the storyline to portray a difference between the luxury of such department store and the simple life most people live, at the same time highlighting basic values. The bear's name was derived from another children's book by Freeman, Corduroy, the Inferior Decorator, which tells about a boy driving his parents crazy by painting on their apartment's walls. The book was never published, but Freeman reused the boy's name when writing Corduroy. Secondly, it has been reported that the name Corduroy had been a nickname for his son, Roy. 

The book was rejected when first sent to Freeman's publisher, Viking Press. The writer then sent it to a number of other publishers, who also provided him with negative feedback. Freeman presented the book once again to Viking Press and was finally given a chance.

Don Freeman wrote a sequel, A Pocket for Corduroy, in 1978 but died before it was published.  In 2006, children's book author B. G. Hennessy published Corduroy Lost and Found as a sequel to Don Freeman's earlier works. A special 40th anniversary edition of Corduroy was released in 2008. Actress Viola Davis wrote a sequel, Corduroy Takes a Bow, which was published by Penguin Random House on September 4, 2018.

Plot
The book tells the story of a teddy bear named Corduroy, displayed on a toy shelf in a department store. One day, a young girl named Lisa arrives at the store with her mother and spots the bear. She is eager to buy him, but her mother refuses to spend more money.  In addition, she notices that the bear is missing a button from his overalls and points this out to Lisa in an attempt to convince her that the bear isn't worth it.

At night, when the shoppers and the people of the department store have gone (and the doors are closed and locked), little Corduroy (when no one is looking) decides to find the missing button himself and goes on a trip around the department store. He rides an escalator and takes himself to the second floor. There, he finds furniture he has never seen before. Corduroy admires the furniture and crawls onto a mattress from one of the beds. Meanwhile, he sees something small and round. Thinking that one of the mattress buttons is the one he is missing, he pulls hard on it and eventually topples from the bed, knocking over a lamp. The store security guard (in the book called a "night watchman") hears the noise from the third floor, discovers the bear, and returns him to the toy department. 

The next day, Lisa comes back with the money she had found in her piggy bank and finally buys Corduroy. At home, she sews a button on his shoulder strap and the book ends with them saying that they both had wanted a friend.  The picture depicts Lisa and Corduroy hugging each other.

Adaptations
 Corduroy was made into a short live-action telefilm in 1984 by Weston Woods and Evergreen/Firehouse Productions.
 In 1997, a direct-to-video animated series, The Adventures of Corduroy, was produced, which ran until 1999.
 In 2000, another animated Corduroy TV series was produced in Canada, which ran on PBS Kids until 2001.
 On November 14, 2016, it was announced that Tim Story will direct a film adaptation of the story for CBS Films, and Walden Media will co-develop the project with Jack and Kate Angelo writing the script.
 A stage adaptation was produced by Children's Theatre Company in 2018.

See also 

 Corduroy, a type of fabric
 1968 in literature

References

1968 children's books
American picture books
Children's fiction books
Fictional teddy bears
Books about bears
Sentient toys in fiction
Viking Press books